Nicholas Economides is an internationally recognized academic authority on network economics, electronic commerce and public policy. His fields of specialization and research include the economics of networks, especially of telecommunications, computers, and information, the economics of technical compatibility and standardization, industrial organization, the structure and organization of financial markets and payment systems, antitrust, application of public policy to network industries, strategic analysis of markets and law and economics.

Professor Economides is a professor of economics at the NYU Stern School of Business.

Professor Economides has published more than 100 articles in top academic journals in the areas of networks, telecommunications, oligopoly, antitrust, product positioning and on the liquidity and the organization of financial markets and exchanges. He holds a PhD and MA in economics from the University of California at Berkeley, as well as a BSc (First Class Honors) in Mathematical Economics from the London School of Economics. Previously, he taught at Columbia University (1981-1988) and at Stanford University (1988-1990). He is editor of the Information Economics and Policy, Netnomics, Quarterly Journal of Electronic Commerce, the Journal of Financial Transformation, Journal of Network Industries, on the Advisory Board of the Social Science Research Network, editor of Economics of Networks Abstracts by SSRN and former editor of the International Journal of Industrial Organization. His website on the Economics of Networks has been ranked as one of the top four economics sites worldwide by The Economist magazine.

Professor Economides is Executive Director of the NET Institute, http://www.NETinst.org, a worldwide focal point for research on the economics of network and high technology industries. He is advisor to the US Federal Trade Commission, the governments of Greece, Ireland, New Zealand and Portugal, the Attorney General of New York State, major telecommunications corporations, a number of the Federal Reserve Banks, the Bank of Greece and major Financial Exchanges. He serves on the Advisory Board of the Economist Intelligence Unit. He has commented extensively in broadcast and in print on high technology, antitrust and public policy issues. He is a founding member of Greek Economists for Reform.com, a blog about economic policy and reforms in Greece.

References

External links 
 Faculty biography page from NYU Stern School of Business 
 Economics of Networks site 
 Greek Economists for Reform.com

University of California, Berkeley alumni
New York University Stern School of Business faculty
Alumni of the London School of Economics
Columbia University faculty
Stanford University Department of Economics faculty
Living people
21st-century American economists
Year of birth missing (living people)